Yiorgos Magoulas (Greek: Γιώργος Μαγουλάς), is a Greek film and orchestral composer. He has written music for the TV documentary series War Zone (Εμπόλεμη Ζώνη, Mega TV) and Foteina Monopatia (Φωτεινά Μονοπάτια, ΕΡΤ) as well as for films, TV adverts and theatricals. He has released 6 CDs Albums, and his works have been recorded and performed by the ERT Contemporary Music Orchestra.

Biography
Born in Athens in 1970, Magoulas studied classical guitar, composition, arrangement and orchestration in Athens (National Conservatory of Athens) and London (Morley College of London).
 
 In 1991, at the age of 21, he began his professional career by writing music for the Research Theatre- Dimitris Potamitis.

 In 1995, he was awarded by the Golden Ermis Award.

 In 1998, following a selection of Stavros Xarchakos, he began his collaboration with the Great Hellenic Foundation (Ίδρυμα Μείζονος Ελληνισμού)
 
 In 2000, his oratorio Propitiation was presented in London, following an assignment by the Church of England.
 
 In 2014, he appeared as a soloist, performing his compositions at the Brussels Winter Jazz Festival. 

 In 2015, he founded and conduct the Alter Move Orchestra. 

 In 2021, he composed the music for the GREECE 2021 committee.

Six CDs albums with his own musical compositions and orchestral film music have been released, while his works have been recorded and performed by the ERT Contemporary Music Orchestra. 

His works have been played in Greece, Cyprus, Turkey, England, Italy, Belgium and France.

References

External links
Yiorgos Magoulas official website

Greek composers
Greek film score composers
Greek classical guitarists
21st-century guitarists

Living people

Year of birth missing (living people)

Place of birth missing (living people)
Musicians from Athens